Thomas Hildred Christie (26 March 1927 – 11 October 2017) was a doctor and rower who represented Great Britain  rowing at the 1948 Summer Olympics and twice won Silver Goblets at Henley Royal Regatta.

Biography
Christie trained as a doctor at King's College, and was a member of Thames Rowing Club. In the 1948 Summer Olympics in London, he was a member of the coxless fours crew. In 1949 he won the Silver Goblets at Henley, partnering Tony Butcher. He also won the Wyfold in 1946 for King's College London, and the Grand and the Stewards in 1948 for Thames Rowing Club.

Christie qualified as a doctor  in 1950 and spent time at Westminster Hospital and  St Thomas' Hospital training in anaesthetics.  He won Silver Goblets at Henley again in 1952 representing Westminster Hospital and partnering H C I Baywater. At the 1954 British Empire and Commonwealth Games he won silver medal in the coxless pairs partnering Nicholas Clack. Christie was a consultant in Brighton and was involved with obstetric anaesthesia and open-heart surgery in its early days.

References

1927 births
2017 deaths
Rowers at the 1948 Summer Olympics
Olympic rowers of Great Britain
Place of birth missing
Commonwealth Games silver medallists for England
English male rowers
Commonwealth Games medallists in rowing
Rowers at the 1954 British Empire and Commonwealth Games
Medallists at the 1954 British Empire and Commonwealth Games